The following is a list of notable deaths in November 2012.

Entries for each day are listed alphabetically by surname. A typical entry lists information in the following sequence:
Name, age, country of citizenship and reason for notability, established cause of death, reference.

November 2012

1
Mary Applebey, 96, English civil servant and mental health campaigner, fall.
Brad Armstrong, 50, American professional wrestler (WWE, WCW, NWA, SMW).
John Lee Armstrong, 79, American football player and coach.
Chen Zude, 68, Chinese Go player, cancer.
Chong Chee Kin, 39, Singaporean journalist, heart failure.
Mir Abdolrez Daryabeigi, 82, Iranian artist.
Stan Enebo, 87, American politician and electrician.
*Agustín García Calvo, 86, Spanish academic, respiratory failure.
Geoffrey Lofthouse, Baron Lofthouse of Pontefract, 86, British politician, MP for Pontefract and Castleford (1978–1997).
Jan Louwers, 82, Dutch footballer (FC Eindhoven).
Mitch Lucker, 28, American musician and singer (Suicide Silence), traffic collision.
Pascual Pérez, 55, Dominican baseball player (Atlanta Braves, Montreal Expos), bludgeoning.
Omry Ronen, 75, Ukrainian-born American Slavist, stroke.
Jonathan Street, 69, British novelist and public relations executive, fall.
Edwin Q. White, 90, American journalist, Saigon bureau chief for the Associated Press (1965–1975), heart failure.

2
Shreeram Shankar Abhyankar, 82, Indian mathematician.
Annette Baier, 83, New Zealand philosopher.
Herman Bank, 96, American mechanical engineer (JPL).
Milt Campbell, 78, American Olympic gold medal-winning (1956) decathlete, prostate cancer and diabetes.
David L. Cornwell, 67, American politician, U.S. Representative from Indiana (1977–1979), kidney cancer.
Peter B. Dews, 89–90, American psychologist and pharmacologist.
Robert Morton Duncan, 85, American federal judge (Armed Forces Court of Appeals, Southern Ohio District Court).
Dusty Ellis, 59, American whistleblower, cancer.
Joe Ginsberg, 86, American baseball player (Chicago White Sox, Cleveland Indians, Detroit Tigers).
*Han Suyin, 95, Chinese-born British writer (A Many-Splendoured Thing).
Emilio Homps, 98, Argentine Olympic silver medal-winning (1948) sailor.
Just A Dash, 35, Australian Thoroughbred racehorse, winner of the 1981 Melbourne Cup and Adelaide Cup, euthanized.
Hans Lindgren, 80, Swedish actor.
Mohammed Rafeh, 30, Syrian actor, shot.
Pino Rauti, 85, Italian politician.
János Rózsás, 86, Hungarian writer.
Ken Stephinson, 79, British television director and producer.
John C. Tyson, 86, American judge (Alabama Court of Criminal Appeals), natural causes.
Roger Wood, 87, Belgian-born American editor and journalist (Daily Express, New York Post), cancer.
*Kinjarapu Yerran Naidu, 55, Indian politician, MP for Srikakulam (1996–2009), traffic collision.

3
Carmélia Alves, 89, Brazilian baião singer, multiple organ seizure.
Hans Henrik Andersen, 75, Danish nuclear physicist.
Sattar Beheshti, 34–35, Iranian blogger.
Marie Bell, 90, New Zealand educationalist.
Anne-Lise Berntsen, 69, Norwegian soprano singer.
Odd Børretzen, 85, Norwegian author and singer, pneumonia.
George Chesterton, 90, British cricketer.
Duke Vin, 84, Jamaican-born British disk jockey and sound system operator.
Franz Dumont, 67, German historian.
Tommy Godwin, 91, British Olympic bronze medal-winning (1948) track cyclist.
Evelyn Byrd Harrison, 82, American classical scholar and archaeologist.
Mükerrem Hiç, 83, Turkish academic and politician.
Greg King, 43, New Zealand lawyer, suicide.
Thomas K. McCraw, 72, American scholar (Harvard University) and author (Prophets of Regulation).
Kailashpati Mishra, 89, Indian politician, Governor of Gujarat and Rajasthan (2003–04), asthma.
Eugenija Pleškytė, 74, Lithuanian actress.
Charles Schwartz, Jr., 90, American senior federal judge (US District Court of Eastern Louisiana).
Ingegerd Troedsson, 83, Swedish politician, MP for Uppsala County (1974–1994), first female Speaker of the Riksdag (1991–1994).
Vasily Vladimirov, 89, Russian mathematician.

4
Anne-Marie Albiach, 75, French poet and translator, following a long illness.
Mildred Vorpahl Baass, 95, American poet, Poet Laureate of Texas (1993–1995).
Akhtaruzzaman Chowdhury Babu, 67, Bangladeshi politician, kidney disease.
Pier Cesare Bori, 75, Italian professor.
J. H. Burns, 90, Scottish historian.
Fabio Castillo Figueroa, 91, Salvadoran politician.
Ted Curson, 77, American jazz trumpeter, heart attack.
Jim Durham, 65, American sportscaster, heart attack.
Samuel S. Freedman, 85, American politician (Connecticut House, 1972–1978), judge (Connecticut Superior Court, 1978–2010); professor (Quinnipiac).
Mike L. Fry, 61, American businessman and entertainer, immune disorder.
Dan Gavriliu, 97, Romanian surgeon.
Beverley Goodway, 69, British glamour photographer, prostate cancer.
Frances Hashimoto, 69, American businesswoman and civic leader, inventor of mochi ice cream, lung cancer.
Marit Henie, 87, Norwegian Olympic (1948) figure skater.
Eiji Hosoya, 67, Japanese businessman, Chairman of Resona Holdings.
Jane Holtz Kay, 74, American architecture and urban design critic and author.
Peter O'Donohue, 89, Australian VFL football player (Hawthorn).
Reg Pickett, 85, English footballer (Portsmouth, Ipswich Town).
Kirk Reeves, 56, American street entertainer, suicide by gunshot.
David Resnick, 88, Brazilian-born Israeli architect and town planner.
Jacob Sahaya Kumar Aruni, 38, Indian restaurateur and television show host, heart attack.
Glen Morgan Williams, 92, American senior federal judge, Western District Court of Virginia (1976–2010).
Verle Wright Jr., 84, American Olympic sports shooter.

5
Assem Salam, 87–88, Lebanese civil engineer.
Umesh Chandra Banerjee, 74, Indian judge.
Bernard Bierman, 104, American composer.
Joseph Oliver Bowers, 102, Dominican-born Antiguan Roman Catholic prelate, Bishop of Accra, Ghana (1953–1971), and Saint John's – Basseterre (1971–1981).
Olympe Bradna, 92, French-born American dancer and actress (College Holiday, Souls at Sea, The Night of Nights).
Julia Britton, 98, Australian playwright.
Charles V. Bush, 72, American air force officer, first African American to graduate from the US Air Force Academy, colon cancer.
Elliott Carter, 103, American composer, natural causes.
Frank Cope, 83, English weightlifter.
Paul L. Douglas, 85, American lawyer and politician.
James R. Dumpson, 103, American public servant, Commissioner of the New York City Department of Welfare (1959–1965), stroke.
Leonardo Favio, 74, Argentine singer, actor, and film director (Chronicle of a Boy Alone, Juan Moreira, Nazareno Cruz and the Wolf), polyneuritis melaminosa and HCV.
Bob Kaplan, 75, Canadian politician, oversaw creation of CSIS, Solicitor General (1980–1984), MP for Don Valley (1968–1972) and York Centre (1974–1993), cancer.
Razaullah Khan, 75, Pakistani cricketer.
Reis Leming, 81, American George Medal-winning airman.
Margaret Nichols, 82, American animator and executive of I.A.T.S.E.
Louis Pienaar, 86, South African lawyer and diplomat, Administrator-General of Namibia (1985–1990).
Keith Ripley, 77, English footballer.
Sikandar Sanam, 48, Pakistani actor and comedian, liver cancer.
Stalking Cat, 54, American body modifier.
Jimmy Stephen, 90, Scottish footballer.
Bertram Wyatt-Brown, 80, American historian and author, pulmonary fibrosis.

6
Larry Alexander, 62, American politician, member of the Massachusetts House (1979–1990).
Aloysius Balina, 67, Tanzanian Roman Catholic prelate, Bishop of Geita (1984–1997) and Shinyanga (since 1997), liver cancer.
Hetty Blok, 92, Dutch actress, comedian, singer and director.
Ron Braden, 64, American football and baseball coach.
Joel Connable, 39, American journalist, diabetic seizure.
Charles Delporte, 83, Belgian painter and sculptor.
Bo Dickinson, 77, American football player.
Clive Dunn, 92, British actor (Dad's Army) and singer ("Grandad"), complications following operation.
Samuel Guo Chuan-zhen, 94, Chinese Roman Catholic prelate, Auxiliary Bishop of Jinan (1997–2000).
Vladimír Jiránek, 74, Czech cartoonist and animator.
Theodore T. Jones, 68, American judge, NY Court of Appeals (since 2007), apparent heart attack.
Carmen Martínez Sierra, 108, Spanish actress.
Ernest Mateen, 46, American boxer, shot.
Maxim of Bulgaria, 98, Bulgarian Orthodox hierarch, Patriarch of All Bulgaria (since 1971), heart ailment.
Panbanisha, 26, American bonobo involved in language studies (Great Ape Trust), common cold.
Ivor Powell, 96, Welsh footballer (Queens Park Rangers, Aston Villa) and coach (Carlisle United, Team Bath).
Frank J. Prial, 82, American journalist and wine critic (The New York Times), complications of prostate cancer.
Damaskinos Roumeliotis, 92, Greek Orthodox hierarch, Metropolitan of Maronia and Komotini (1974–2012), multiple organ failure.
Bohdan Tsap, 71, Ukrainian footballer and youth football trainer.
Carmen Warschaw, 95, American politician and philanthropist, natural causes.

7
Carmen Basilio, 85, American dual world champion boxer, pneumonia.
Ray Beckwith, 100, South Australian wine chemist.
Aleksandr Berkutov, 80, Russian Olympic gold medal-winning (1956, 1960) rower.
Heinz-Jürgen Blome, 65, German footballer (VfL Bochum).
Murray Byrne, 84, Australian politician, member of the Victorian Legislative Council for Ballarat Province (1958–1976).
Henry Colman, 89, American producer and screenwriter.
Alan Coxon, 82, English cricketer.
Ellen Douglas, 91, American writer, heart failure.
Kevin O'Donnell, Jr., 61, American science fiction author, lung cancer.
David Olive, 75, British theoretical physicist.
Glenys Page, 72, New Zealand cricketer.
Sandy Pearson, 94, Australian major general, Commander of the 1st Australian Task Force (1968–1969).
Frank Peppiatt, 85, Canadian-born American television writer and producer, co-creator of Hee Haw, bladder cancer.
Richard Robbins, 71, American musician and score writer (Howards End, Remains of the Day, A Room with a View), Parkinson's disease.
Darrell Royal, 88, American football coach (University of Texas), Alzheimer's disease.
Arthur K. Snyder, 79, American politician, Los Angeles City Councilman (1967–1985).
Elliott Stein, 83, American film critic and historian.

8
Péricles Azambuja, 85, Brazilian historian, writer and journalist.
Lucille Bliss, 96, American voice actress (Crusader Rabbit, The Smurfs, Invader Zim), natural causes.
Robert McCallum Blumenthal, 81, American mathematician.
Herbert Carter, 93, American pilot (Tuskegee Airmen).
György Danis, 67, Hungarian politician.
Bruce Evans, 87, Australian politician, member of the Victorian Legislative Assembly for Gippsland East (1961–1992).
Bobby Gilfillan, 74, Scottish footballer (Doncaster Rovers), prostate cancer.
Gerard Gramse, 68, Polish sprinter.
Roger Hammond, 76, British actor (The King's Speech, Around the World in 80 Days), cancer.
Cornel Lucas, 92, British photographer.
Lee MacPhail, 95, American baseball Hall of Fame general manager (Baltimore Orioles, New York Yankees), American League President (1973–1984), natural causes.
Pete Namlook, 51, German electronic musician, producer and composer, founder of FAX music label, heart attack.
Patrick Francis Sheehan, 80, Irish-born Nigerian Roman Catholic prelate, Bishop of Yola (1970–1996) and Kano (1996–2008).
Robert Swenning, 88, American figure skater.

9
Pirkko Aro, 89, Finnish journalist and politician.
John Attenborough, 84, English businessman, brother of Richard Attenborough and David Attenborough.
Leaford Bearskin, 91, American tribal leader, Chief of the Wyandotte Nation (1983–2011).
Roger Blais, 95, Canadian film director and producer.
Aïssatou Boiro, 57–58, Guinean civil servant, murdered.
William Brandon Lacy Campos, 35, African American poet, HIV and gay rights activist.
Nora Bustamante Luciani, 88, Venezuelan physician, historian, writer and intellectual.
Milan Čič, 80, Slovak lawyer and politician, Prime Minister of the Slovak Socialist Republic (1989–1990), complications from a stroke.
Iurie Darie, 83, Romanian actor (A Bomb Was Stolen), complications from a stroke.
Joseph D. Early, 79, American politician, member of the House of Representatives from Massachusetts (1975–1993).
Valerie Eliot, 86, British editor, widow of T. S. Eliot.
Isaac Fadoyebo, 86, Nigerian soldier.
Harold Gould, 88, American baseball player (Philadelphia Stars).
Major Harris, 65, American R&B singer ("Love Won't Let Me Wait"), member of The Delfonics, heart and lung failure.
Bobbi Jordan, 75, American actress (General Hospital, Mame), heart attack.
Will van Kralingen, 61, Dutch actress (Havinck, Temmink: The Ultimate Fight), cancer.
Herbie Kronowitz, 89, American boxer.
Helen Mussallem, 97, Canadian nurse.
Sergey Nikolsky, 107, Russian mathematician.
Billy O'Brien, 83, American politician, member of the Virginia House (1974–1992).
Bernard Perera, 56, Sri Lankan cricketer.
Paul Petrie, 84, American poet and academic.
Pat Renella, 83, American actor (Bullitt, General Hospital, The New Phil Silvers Show).
Jim Sinclair, 79, Canadian non-status Indian aboriginal activist and politician, cancer.
Malcolm Smith, 80, South African cricketer.
James L. Stone, 89, American army officer and prisoner of war, recipient of the Medal of Honor.
Bill Tarmey, 71, British actor (Coronation Street), heart attack.
Hubert Zimmermann, 71, French computer scientist.

10
Witkop Badenhorst, 71–72, South African Army general, pneumonia and heart failure.
Robert Carter, 102, British Royal Air Force officer.
Isabel Coe, 61, Australian rights activists.
John Louis Coffey, 90, American federal judge (U.S. 7th Circuit Court of Appeals).
Eric Day, 91, English footballer (Southampton F.C.).
Eric Devenport, 86, British Anglican prelate, Bishop of Dunwich (1980–1992).
Stuart Freedman, 68, American physicist.
Kekoo Gandhy, 92, Indian art gallerist, art collector and art connoisseur, pancreatic cancer.
Gilbert Geis, 87, American criminologist.
Wilhelm Hennis, 89, German political scientist.
Sándor Kiss, 71, Hungarian Olympic gymnast.
Marian Lines, 78, British writer and actress.
Mitsuko Mori, 92, Japanese actress, heart failure.
Mynavathi, 78, Indian actress, cardiac arrest.
Ricky Naputi, 39, Guamanian obese man, heaviest in world.
Alexander Perepilichny, 44, Russian businessman and whistleblower.
Piet van Zeil, 85, Dutch politician, State Secretary for Economic Affairs (1981–1986) and Social Affairs (1982), Mayor of Heerlen (1986–1992).

11
Lam Adesina, 73, Nigerian politician, Governor of Oyo State (1999–2003).
Edith Anrep, 100, Swedish lawyer and feminist.
Joe Egan, 93, British rugby league footballer.
Tomaž Ertl, 79, Slovenian communist-era politician.
Alex Esclamado, 84, Filipino-born American media and civic leader, pneumonia.
David Gwynne-James, 75, Welsh first-class cricketer, British Army officer and military historian, head injuries sustained after a heart attack.
Iqbal Haider, 67, Pakistani politician, Law Minister (1993–1994), lung disease.
Sir Rex Hunt, 86, British diplomat and colonial administrator, Governor of the Falkland Islands (1980–1982, 1982–1985).
Farish Jenkins, 72, American palaeontologist, complications of pneumonia.
Jalal Mansouri, 82, Iranian Olympic weightlifter.
Victor Mees, 85, Belgian footballer (Royal Antwerp F.C.).
Patricia Monaghan, 66, American author.
Ilya Oleynikov, 65, Russian comedian and actor, cardiovascular disease.
Johnny Prescott, 74, English boxer.
Harry Wayland Randall, 96, American World War II veteran and war photographer.
Tarachand Sahu, 65, Indian politician, MP for Durg (1996–2009), multiple organ failure.
Hal Ziegler, 80, American politician, member of the Michigan House (1966–1974), Michigan Senate (1975–1978), heart attack.

12
Charles Kofi Agbenaza, 80–81, Ghanaian politician.
Coty Beavers, 28, American murder victim, shot.
Arthur Bialas, 81, German footballer.
Marshall Bouldin III, 89, American portrait painter.
Dave Cahill, 71, American football player.
Robert J. Cotter, 69, American chemist and mass spectrometrist, heart failure.
Angela Cropper, 66, Trinidadian diplomat and politician.
Anthony di Bonaventura, 83, American pianist and academic.
Bob French, 74, American jazz musician and radio show host, dementia and diabetes.
Hans Hammarskiöld, 87, Swedish photographer, after a brief illness.
Alan Hopkins, 86, British politician, complications following a heart operation.
Michel Hrynchyshyn, 83, Canadian-born French Ukrainian Catholic hierarch, Apostolic Exarch in France, Benelux and Switzerland (1982–2012).
Harry McShane, 92, Scottish footballer.
Mario Murillo, 85, Costa Rican footballer.
Sergio Oliva, 71, Cuban-born American bodybuilder, Mr. Olympia (1967–1969).
Fred Ridgeway, 59, English actor, motor neurone disease.
Daniel Stern, 78, American psychiatrist, heart failure.
Ronald Stretton, 82, English Olympic bronze medal-winning (1952) track cyclist.
Willis Whitfield, 92, American physicist and inventor (Cleanroom).
John Winter, 82, British architect, respiratory failure.
Wilbur Woo, 96, Chinese-born American politician and community leader, complications from stroke and pneumonia.
Walt Zeboski, 83, American photographer (Associated Press), pneumonia.

13
Murray Arnold, 74, American basketball coach (Chattanooga Mocs, Perth Wildcats), cancer.
Will Barnet, 101, American painter.
Naima Bayari, Moroccan Muay Thai kickboxer, gas leak.
Bryce Bayer, 83, American scientist (Bayer filter).
Ray Carter, 79, English cricketer.
Erazm Ciołek, 75, Polish photojournalist.
Kenneth Cragg, 99, British Anglican priest and scholar.
*Robert Shirley, 13th Earl Ferrers, 83, British peer, Deputy Leader of the House of Lords (1979–1983, 1988–1997).
Jack Gilbert, 87, American poet, pneumonia with complications from Alzheimer's disease.
Milan Horálek, 80, Czech economist and politician, Minister of Labour and Social Affairs (1990–1992).
John Kelly, 82, Irish Olympic racewalker.
Manuel Peña Escontrela, 46, Spanish footballer (Real Zaragoza, Real Valladolid), cancer.
John Sheridan, 78, English rugby league footballer (Castleford).
Yao Defen, 40, Chinese record holder, world's tallest woman.
Ray Zone, 65, American cinema historian, adaptor and 3D expert, heart attack.

14
Alex Alves, 37, Brazilian footballer (Hertha BSC), leukemia.
Enrique Beech, 92, Filipino Olympic shooter.
Harold G. Christensen, 86, American attorney, cancer.
William Cusano, 69, Italian-born Canadian politician, complications from surgery.
Brian Davies, 82, Australian rugby league footballer.
Martin Fay, 76, Irish musician (The Chieftains).
Wendell Garrett, 83, American historian, appraiser on Antiques Roadshow, natural causes.
Joe Gilliam, Sr., 89, American football coach (Tennessee State).
Daniel Goodman, 67, American ecologist and biologist, complications from surgery.
Norman Greenwood, 87, Australian-born British chemist.
Gail Harris, 81, American baseball player (New York Giants, Detroit Tigers).
Ramon Torres Hernandez, 41, American serial killer, execution by lethal injection.
Ahmed Jabari, 52, Palestinian military leader (Hamas), airstrike.
Lucien Laferte, 93, Canadian ski jumper.
Bertram McLean, 64, Jamaican musician.
Paddy Meegan, 90, Irish football player (Meath GAA).
Luíz Eugênio Pérez, 84, Brazilian Roman Catholic prelate, Bishop of Jales (1970–1981) and Jaboticabal (1981–2003), complications following surgery.
Olusola Saraki, 79, Nigerian politician.
Stanley Smith, 75, English rugby league footballer.
Adrián Silva Moreno, 34, Mexican journalist, shot.

15
Théophile Abega, 58, Cameroonian footballer (Canon Yaoundé, Toulouse F.C.), cardiac arrest.
Kader Bhayat, 76, Mauritian lawyer and politician.
Luis Carreira, 35, Portuguese motorcycle racer, race collision.
Harry Christiani, 87, Guyanese cricketer.
Harvey Tristan Cropper, 81, American painter, cancer.
Pete Eneh, Nigerian actor, after leg amputation.
María Santos Gorrostieta Salazar, 36, Mexican politician, Mayor of Tiquicheo (2008–2011), beating and stabbing.
Khin Maung Toe, 62, Burmese singer–songwriter, cancer.
Josef Kloimstein, 84, Austrian Olympic silver (1960) and bronze (1956) medal-winning rower.
Maleli Kunavore, 29, Fijian rugby player (Toulouse), cardiac arrest.
Moosa Mangera, 67, South African cricketer.
Gerrit Oosting, 71, Dutch politician.
K. C. Pant, 81, Indian politician, Minister of Defence (1987–1989), heart attack.
David Oliver Relin, 49, American journalist and author, suicide by blunt force head injury.
José Song Sui-Wan, 71, Chinese-born Brazilian Roman Catholic prelate, Bishop of São Gabriel da Cachoeira (2002–2009), Parkinson's disease and liver tumor.
Frode Thingnæs, 72, Norwegian jazz musician ("The First Day of Love", "Mata Hari"), complications from a heart attack.
William Turnbull, 90, Scottish artist.

16
Stuart Babbage, 96, Australian Anglican priest, Dean of Sydney (1947–1953) and Melbourne (1953–1962).
Leo Blair, 89, British academic.
David Bolt, 84, English novelist and literary agent.
Alby Broadby, 95, Australian politician, member (1968–1988) and President (1984–1988) of the Tasmanian Legislative Council.
Eric Burgin, 88, British cricketer (Yorkshire).
Fernando Casanova, 86, Mexican actor, prostate cancer.
John Chapman, 82, Australian evangelist, multiple organ failure.
Luis de los Cobos, 85, Spanish composer.
Louis Tom Dragna, 92, Italian-American mobster.
Subhash Dutta, 82, Bangladeshi filmmaker, heart disease.
Patrick Edlinger, 52, French climber, fall.
Kayode Eso, 87, Nigerian jurist.
Jefferson Kaye, 75, American radio, television, and film announcer, cancer.
Aliu Mahama, 66, Ghanaian politician, Vice President (2001–2009), complications from a stroke.
Hubert Meyer, 98, German army officer.
Helen Milliken, 89, American First Lady of Michigan (1969–1983), ovarian cancer.
James W. Moseley, 81, American ufologist.
Eliyahu Nawi, 92, Israeli politician and jurist, Mayor of Beersheba (1963–1986).
Bob Scott, 91, New Zealand rugby union player.
Bob Wiggins, 79, American Negro American League baseball outfielder.

17
Sushila Adivarekar, 89, Indian politician.
Nina Aleshina, 88, Russian architect.
Ingrid Bruce, 72, Swedish engineer.
Ponty Chadha, 55, Indian businessman, shot.
Armand Desmet, 81, Belgian professional cyclist.
Branko Elsner, 82, Slovenian footballer and coach.
Richard Felt, 79, American football player (New York Titans, Boston Patriots), natural causes.
Bonnie Lynn Fields, 68, American actress (Angel in My Pocket, Bye Bye Birdie, Funny Girl) and Mouseketeer, throat cancer.
Kathleen Fowler, 87, Australian military officer.
Christian Godefroy, 64, French author.
Lea Gottlieb, 94, Israeli fashion designer.
Henryk Grzybowski, 78, Polish footballer (Legia Warsaw).
Katherine Kath, 92, French ballerina turned actress.
Robert Lin, 70, Chinese-born American professor and experimental physicist, stroke.
Arnaud Maggs, 86, Canadian artist and photographer.
Eduardo Morales Miranda, 102, Chilean educator, co-founder of the Universidad Austral de Chile.
Cliff Pilkey, 90, Canadian politician and trade union leader.
Freddy Schmidt, 96, American baseball player (St. Louis Cardinals, Philadelphia Phillies, Chicago Cubs).
Billy Scott, 70, American singer, pancreatic and liver cancer.
David Speer, 61, American businessman, CEO of Illinois Tool Works, cancer.
Bal Thackeray, 86, Indian politician, cardio-respiratory arrest.
Margaret Yorke, 88, British crime fiction writer.

18
Graham Anderson, 83, British-born Canadian heraldic scholar and officer of arms.
*Emilio Aragón Bermúdez, 83, Spanish clown, accordionist, and singer.
Alan Barblett, 83, Australian Olympic hockey player.
Burke Deadrich, 67, American wrestler.
Elena Donaldson-Akhmilovskaya, 55, Russian-born American chess grandmaster, brain cancer.
David Eaton, 78, South African cricketer.
Stan Greig, 82, Scottish pianist, drummer, and bandleader, Parkinson's disease.
* Phoebe Hearst Cooke, 85, American businesswoman (Hearst Corporation) and philanthropist, pneumonia.
Francis D. Imbuga, 65, Kenyan playwright and academic, stroke.
Ian Kirkpatrick, 82, South African rugby union player and coach.
Neva Jane Langley, 79, American beauty pageant queen, Miss America (1953), cancer.
Sir Philip Ledger, 74, British classical musician and academic.
William McCarthy, Baron McCarthy, 87, British politician and life peer.
Kenny Morgans, 73, Welsh footballer (Manchester United), Munich air disaster survivor.
Kyrillos Oikonomopoulos, 82, Cypriot-born Zimbabwean Orthodox hierarch, Metropolitan of Zimbabwe (2001–2002).
Ed Richards, 83, American Olympic fencer (1964).
Helmut Sonnenfeldt, 86, German-born American foreign policy official, Alzheimer's disease.
Don R. Swanson, 88, American information scientist.

19
James Bassham, 89, American scientist.
David G. Cantor, 76–77, American mathematician.
Ken Charlton, 89, Australian rugby league footballer.
John Cooper, 90, Australian cricketer.
Omar Abdallah Dakhqan, Jordanian politician, Agriculture Minister.
Bill Durkin, 90, American basketball player.
John Hefin, 71, Welsh television director and producer (Pobol y Cwm, The Life and Times of David Lloyd George), cancer.
Viter Juste, 87, Haitian-born American community leader, coined the term "Little Haiti", dementia and diabetes.
Magnus Lindgren, 30, Swedish chef, traffic collision.
Hannie Lips, 88, Dutch television announcer.
Shiro Miya, 69, Japanese enka singer.
Pete La Roca, 74, American jazz drummer, lung cancer.
Joe Riordan, 82, Australian politician, member of the House of Representatives for Phillip (1972–1975), Minister for Housing and Construction (1975).
Warren Rudman, 82, American politician, Senator from New Hampshire (1980–1993), lymphoma.
Boris Strugatsky, 79, Russian science fiction author, pneumonia.
George D. Weber, 87, American politician, member of the Missouri House of Representatives (1965–1967), lymphoma.

20
Kaspars Astašenko, 37, Latvian ice hockey player (Tampa Bay Lightning).
*Pedro Bantigue y Natividad, 92, Filipino Roman Catholic prelate, Bishop of San Pablo (1967–1995), internal bleeding.
Jersey Bridgeman, 6, American murder victim, strangulation.
David C. Copley, 60, American publishing heir (Copley Press) and socialite, apparent heart attack.
Michael Dunford, 68, English musician.
Louis O. Giuffrida, 92, American army general, Director of Federal Emergency Management Agency (1981–1985).
Redd Griffin, 73, American politician, member of Illinois General Assembly (1980–1983).
William Grut, 98, Swedish Olympic gold medal-winning (1948) modern pentathlete.
Gary Ingham, 48, English footballer (Doncaster Rovers).
Ivan Kušan, 80, Croatian writer.
David O'Brien Martin, 68, American politician, member of the House of Representatives from New York (1981–1993), cancer.
Flora Martirosian, 55, Armenian singer, complications following gall bladder surgery.
Mike Ryan, 77, Irish-born American soccer coach and first head coach of the US women's national team, aplastic anemia.

21
Stephen Abrams, 74, American-born British drug policy activist.
Berthold Albrecht, 58, German businessman.
Mladen Bašić, 95, Croat pianist and conductor.
Roland Baudric, 87, French wrestler.
Dann Cahn, 89, American film and television editor (I Love Lucy), natural causes.
Charles Denman, 5th Baron Denman, 96, British businessman and peer.
Nick Discepola, 62, Italian-born Canadian politician, MP for Vaudreuil (1993–1997) and Vaudreuil-Soulanges (1997–2004), pancreatic neuroendocrine tumor.
Harold Fiskari, 84, Canadian ice hockey player.
Mr. Food, 81, American television chef (Mr. Food), pancreatic cancer.
Șerban Ionescu, 62, Romanian actor, amyotrophic lateral sclerosis.
Ajmal Kasab, 25, Pakistani gunman involved in 2008 Mumbai attacks, execution by hanging.
Ernesto McCausland, 51, Colombian journalist and filmmaker, cancer.
Vladka Meed, 90, Polish Jewish resistance member (Warsaw Ghetto Uprising survivor), Alzheimer's disease.
Edwarda O'Bara, 59, American medical patient, died after 42 years in a diabetic coma.
Nedu Onyeuku, 29, Nigerian basketball player, shot.
Austin Peralta, 22, American jazz musician and composer.
Deborah Raffin, 59, American actress (Once Is Not Enough, Death Wish 3, 7th Heaven), leukemia.
Stein Schjærven, 78, Norwegian marketing agent.
Rashid Sharafetdinov, 69, Russian Olympic long-distance runner.
Eugene Smith, 94, American pilot (Tuskegee Airmen) and attorney.
Algirdas Šocikas, 84, Lithuanian Olympic boxer.
Emily Squires, 71, American television director (Sesame Street) and scriptwriter (Guiding Light, As the World Turns).
Mack B. Stokes, 100, American bishop in the United Methodist Church.
*Wang Houjun, 69, Chinese footballer (Shanghai Shenhua) and coach (Shanghai Pudong), uremia.

22
Frank Barsalona, 74, American talent agent and concert promoter, Alzheimer's disease.
Peter Bennett, 77, American music promoter, heart attack.
Bob Burtwell, 85, Canadian Olympic basketball player.
Pearl Laska Chamberlain, 103, American aviator.
John Earl Coleman, 82, American Vipassana meditation teacher. 
Bryce Courtenay, 79, South African-born Australian novelist (The Power of One), stomach cancer.
Weldon Drew, 77, American basketball coach, automobile accident.
Raimund Krauth, 59, German footballer (Eintracht Frankfurt, Karlsruher SC).
Bennie McRae, 72, American football player (Chicago Bears).
Yashar Nuri, 60, Azerbaijani actor.
P. Govinda Pillai, 86, Indian politician.
Fahimeh Rastkar, 80, Iranian actress and voice dubbing artist, Alzheimer's disease.
Ken Rowe, 78, American baseball player (Baltimore Orioles, Los Angeles Dodgers), pneumonia.
Lyubov Sadchikova, 61, Russian Olympic speed skater.
Mel Shaw, 97, American design artist (Fantasia, Bambi, The Fox and the Hound, The Lion King), heart failure.
K. H. Ting, 97, Chinese Anglican bishop.
Jan Trefulka, 83, Czech writer and dissident, signatory of the Charter 77, renal failure and pneumonia.

23
Veerapandy S. Arumugam, 75, Indian politician, respiratory failure.
Sava Babić, 78, Serbian writer, poet, translator and university professor.
John Bara, 85, American politician.
José Luis Borau, 83, Spanish filmmaker, throat cancer.
Noel Botham, 72, British journalist and author.
Peter Dawson, 66, English cricketer.
Akkamma Devi, 94, Indian politician, MP for Nilgiris (1962–1967), first Badaga woman to graduate from college.
Chuck Diering, 89, American baseball player (St. Louis Cardinals), cerebral hemorrhage.
Gray Foy, 90, American artist.
Go Native, 9, Irish Thoroughbred racehorse, winner of the 2009 Fighting Fifth Hurdle and Christmas Hurdle.
Lawrence Guyot, 73, American civil rights activist, heart disease and diabetes.
Larry Hagman, 81, American actor (Dallas, I Dream of Jeannie, Nixon), complications from throat cancer.
Diana, Lady Isaac, 91, English-born New Zealand environmentalist and arts patron.
John Kemeny, 87, Hungarian-born Canadian film producer (The Apprenticeship of Duddy Kravitz, Atlantic City), cancer.
Tadeusz Kwapień, 89, Polish cross country skier.
Alfonso Montemayor, 90, Mexican footballer (Club León).
Giuseppe Nahmad, 80, Syrian art dealer.
Adolph Peschke, 98, American outdoorsman, author and project designer in the Boy Scouts of America.
Nelson Prudêncio, 68, Brazilian Olympic silver (1968) and bronze (1972) medal-winning triple jumper, complications from lung cancer.
Goffredo Stabellini, 87, Italian footballer.
Robert O. Swados, 93, American attorney and businessman.
Hal Trosky, Jr., 76, American baseball player (Chicago White Sox), lung cancer.

24
Marcel Beaudry, 79, Canadian lawyer, politician and public official, cancer.
Héctor Camacho, 50, Puerto Rican former triple world champion boxer, injuries from gunshot.
Alec Campbell, 80, British-born Botswanan archaeologist and historian, leukemia.
Ian Campbell, 79, British folk musician (Ian Campbell Folk Group), cancer.
Ardeshir Cowasjee, 86, Pakistani newspaper columnist (Dawn), chest ailment.
G. Edward Haynsworth, 90, American Episcopal prelate, missionary to Nicaragua.
Antoine Kohn, 79, Luxembourgian football player and manager.
Tony Leblanc, 90, Spanish actor, heart attack.
Shawn Little, 48, Canadian politician, heart failure.
Frank Pittman, 77, American psychiatrist and author (Private Lies: Infidelity and Betrayal of Intimacy), cancer.
Joan Shepherd, 88, British athlete.
Chris Stamp, 70, British music producer and manager (The Who), cancer.
Jimmy Stewart, 73, American baseball player (Chicago Cubs, Cincinnati Reds, Houston Astros).
Moniek Toebosch, 64, Dutch actress, artist and musician, enthusasia.
Nicholas Turro, 74, American chemist, pancreatic cancer.
Ernie Warlick, 80, American football player (Buffalo Bills, Calgary Stampeders).

25
Juan Carlos Calderón, 74, Spanish composer and conductor.
Earl Carroll, 75, American singer (The Cadillacs, The Coasters), complications of a stroke and diabetes.
Clifford Digre, 89, American entrepreneur.
Guilherme Espírito Santo, 93, Portuguese footballer and athlete.
Simeon ten Holt, 89, Dutch contemporary classical composer.
Lars Hörmander, 81, Swedish mathematician.
Hans Kuhn, 92, Swiss physical chemist.
Bert Linnecor, 78, English footballer.
Luo Yang, 51, Chinese engineer, developer of the Shenyang J-15 program, heart attack.
Mark Meier, 86, American glaciologist and academic.
Juan Pereda, 81, Bolivian military leader, President (1978).
Tom Robinson, 74, Bahamian Olympic sprinter (1956, 1960, 1964, 1968).
Roy Thomas Severn, 83, British civil engineer.
Dave Sexton, 82, English footballer and manager (Chelsea, Manchester United).
Dinah Sheridan, 92, English actress (The Railway Children).
Martin Smyth, 76, Irish Olympic boxer.
Lary J. Swoboda, 73, American politician, member of Wisconsin State Assembly (1970–1994), heart attack.
Jim Temp, 79, American football player (Green Bay Packers), heart disease.
Carlisle Towery, 92, American basketball player (Fort Wayne Zollner Pistons).

26
*Celso Ad. Castillo, 69, Filipino director and actor, cardiac arrest.
Theo Brandmüller, 64, German composer.
Jim Brewington, 73, American football player.
Paul Neeley Brown, 86, American senior judge of the District Court for the Eastern District of Texas.
Denis Haynes, 88, English cricketer (Staffordshire).
Bill Hollar, 74, American racing driver.
Edward R. Kirkland, 89, American politician.
Joe Kulbacki, 74, American football player (Buffalo Bills).
Mike Kume, 86, American Major League Baseball player.
Peter Marsh, 64, Australian paralympian.
Joseph Murray, 93, American doctor and Nobel laureate (1990), performed first kidney transplantation, hemorrhagic stroke.
Peter C. Myers, 81, American politician, member of the Missouri House of Representatives (1998–2006), Deputy Secretary of the USDA (1982–1989).
P. K. Venukuttan Nair, 81, Indian actor (Oolkatal, Swapnadanam).
M. C. Nambudiripad, 93, Indian science writer.
Kuno Pajula, 88, Estonian Evangelical Lutheran prelate, Archbishop (1987–1994).
Martin Richards, 80, American Broadway and film producer (Chicago, La Cage aux Folles), cancer.
Buddy Roberts, 67, American professional wrestler, member of the Fabulous Freebirds, pneumonia.
César Sánchez, 77, Bolivian footballer.
David Schwendeman, 87, American taxidermist (American Museum of Natural History).
Hans Jørgen Walle-Hansen, 100, Norwegian businessman.
Richard Wilkins, 59, American lawyer.

27
Maddela Abel, 88, Indian political scientist.
Mickey Baker, 87, American guitarist (Mickey & Sylvia) and songwriter ("Love Is Strange"), heart and kidney failure.
Viacheslav Belavkin, 66, Russian-British mathematician.
Gilbert Clements, 84, Canadian politician, Lieutenant Governor of Prince Edward Island (1995–2001).
Pat Connolly, 84, Canadian sports broadcaster, throat cancer and melanoma.
Theophilus Danzy, 82, American football coach.
Jim Davis, 84, American politician, member of the Indiana House of Representatives (1982–1998).
Ab Fafié, 71, Dutch footballer and coach.
Érik Izraelewicz, 58, French media executive (Le Monde), heart attack.
Pascal Kalemba, 33, Congolese footballer.
Bob Kellett, 84, English film and television director.
Ladislas Kijno, 91, Polish-born French painter.
Jorma Limmonen, 78, Finnish Olympic boxer.
Marvin Miller, 95, American union leader, executive director of the Major League Baseball Players Association (1966–1982), liver cancer.
Herbert Oberhofer, 57, Austrian footballer (Admira Wacker).
Chris Odera, 48, Kenyan Olympic boxer, kidney failure.
Lennart Samuelsson, 88, Swedish footballer.
Assane Seck, 93, Senegalese politician, Foreign Minister (1973–1978).
Bennie Turner, 64, American politician and lawyer, member of the Mississippi State Senate (since 1992), brain cancer.
Jack Wishna, 54, American businessman, suicide by carbon monoxide poisoning.

28
Evelyn Ackerman, 88, American industrial designer.
Ahmed bin Hamed al Hamed, 82–83, UAE's politician.
Knut Ahnlund, 89, Swedish literary historian, writer, member of the Swedish Academy.
Shahid Akbar, 54, Indian cricketer, multiple organ failure.
Sir William Bulmer, 92, British businessman, Lord Lieutenant of West Yorkshire (1978–1985).
Gloria Davy, 81, American opera singer.
*José Maria Fidélis dos Santos, 68, Brazilian footballer (Bangu Atlético Clube), cancer.
Jerry Finkelstein, 96, American media mogul and businessman (The Hill, New York Law Journal).
Jakes Gerwel, 66, South African academic and corporate executive, complications following heart surgery.
Tom Hardman, 21, English cricketer.
Ray Heffner, 87, American academic, president of Brown University (1966–1969).
James Day Hodgson, 96, American politician, Secretary of Labor (1970–1974) and Ambassador to Japan (1974–1977).
Jerry D. Mahlman, 72, American meteorologist.
Philip Mastin, 82, American politician, member of Michigan House of Representatives (1970–1976) and the Michigan Senate (1983), first Michigan Senator to be recalled.
Cosimo Nocera, 74, Italian footballer (Foggia Calcio).
Don Rhymer, 51, American film (Big Momma's House, Surf's Up, Rio) and television writer (Evening Shade), complications of head and neck cancer.
Spain Rodriguez, 72, American underground cartoonist, cancer.
Albie Thoms, 71, Australian film director, writer, and producer.
Franco Ventriglia, 90, American opera singer.
Zig Ziglar, 86, American author and motivational speaker, pneumonia.

29
Velia Abdel-Huda, 96, Egyptian art historian and socialite.
Joelmir Beting, 75, Brazilian journalist and writer, stroke.
Eldon Edge, 86, American politician.
Maddalena Fagandini, 83, British electronic musician and television producer.
Bo Lozoff, 65, American writer and interfaith humanitarian, traffic collision.
Susan Luckey, 74, American actress (The Music Man, Carousel), natural causes.
Sherab Palden Beru, 100 or 101, Tibetan thangka artist.
Marie-Jacques Perrier, 88, French singer and fashion journalist.
Merv Pregulman, 90, American football player (Green Bay Packers, Detroit Lions, New York Bulldogs), steel executive and philanthropist.
Klaus Schütz, 86, German politician, Mayor of West Berlin (1967–1977), President of the Bundesrat (1967–1968).
Werner Seibold, 64, German Olympic bronze medallist sport shooter (1976).
Joyce Spiliotis, 65, American politician, member of the Massachusetts House of Representatives (since 2003), cancer.
Benjamin Tatar, 82, American actor (The Wind and the Lion, The Piano Lesson), chronic pulmonary disease.
Ronald Frank Thiemann, 66, American professor and author, pancreatic cancer.
Zora Wolfová, 84, Czech translator.
Cuthbert Woodroffe, 94, Barbadian prelate, Primate of the West Indies (1980–1986).

30
Rogelio Álvarez, 74, Cuban-born American baseball player (Cincinnati Reds), complications of kidney disease.
Mario Ardizzon, 74, Italian footballer.
Barry Berkus, 77, American architect, author and art collector.
Lars-Gunnar Björklund, 75, Swedish radio and TV journalist.
Rick Blackburn, 70, American music executive.
Roman Butenko, 32, Ukrainian football player, car crash.
Gregory S. Clark, 65, American politician.
Kélétigui Diabaté, 81, Malian musician.
Dolores Donlon, 92, American model and actress.
Jacqueline Duc, 90, French actress.
Jamelle Folsom, 85, American First Lady of Alabama (1948–1951, 1955–1959), mother of Jim Folsom, Jr., cancer.
Stephen Gray, 89, English musical administrator, managed the Royal Liverpool Philharmonic.
I. K. Gujral, 92, Indian politician, Prime Minister (1997–1998), multiple organ failure.
Munir Malik, 78, Pakistani cricketer.
Dolores Mantez, 76, British television actress (UFO).
Jeff Millar, 70, American film critic (Houston Chronicle) and comic strip writer (Tank McNamara), bile duct cancer.
Susil Moonesinghe, 82, Sri Lankan politician and diplomat.
Homer R. Warner, 90, American cardiologist, father of medical informatics, complications of pancreatitis.
Athar Zaidi, 66, Pakistani Test cricket umpire.

References

2012-11
 11